Joseph Pendleton Hoge (December 15, 1810 – August 14, 1891) was an American politician, lawyer, and judge. He was a member of the United States House of Representatives from Illinois.

Biography 
Born in Steubenville, Ohio, Hoge attended the common schools and was graduated from Jefferson College (now Washington & Jefferson College. He studied law.
He admitted to the bar in 1836. He moved to Galena 1836 and practiced law. He hed several local offices.

With the help of the Mormon citizens of Nauvoo, who voted for him en masse. Hoge was elected by the Illinois's 6th congressional district as a Democrat to the Twenty-eighth and Twenty-ninth Congresses (from March 4, 1843 to March 3, 1847). He was not a candidate for renomination in 1846. He resumed the practice of law in Galena. 

He moved to California in 1853 and continued the practice of his profession. He was an unsuccessful candidate for election to the United States Senate in 1869. He served as president of the State constitutional convention in 1878 and of the board of freeholders in 1880. He served as judge of the superior court from January 1, 1889, until his death in San Francisco, California, August 14, 1891.

He was interred in Laurel Hill Cemetery in San Francisco, California.

References

External links
 

1810 births
1891 deaths
Washington & Jefferson College alumni
Politicians from Steubenville, Ohio
Democratic Party members of the United States House of Representatives from Illinois
19th-century American politicians
Burials at Laurel Hill Cemetery (San Francisco)